Michael or Mike Sheridan may refer to:
Michael Sheridan (musician), Australian musician
Michael Sheridan (Irish politician) (1896–1970), member of Fianna Fáil party
Michael Henry Sheridan (1912–1976), U.S. federal judge
Michael John Sheridan (1945-2022), American Roman Catholic bishop
Michael J. Sheridan (born 1958), auto worker and former Democratic member of the Wisconsin State Assembly
Michael Joseph Sheridan, known as Joe Sheridan (1914–2000), Irish independent politician
Michael K. Sheridan (born 1934), U.S. Marine Corps general
Mike Sheridan (born 1991), Danish musician